Alex Hagelsteens (born 15 July 1956) is a retired Belgian athlete who specialised to long-distance running and cross-country. He competed at the 1980 Summer Olympics in the 5000 and 10000 m events but failed to reach the finals. Hagelsteens was most successful at the Egmond Half Marathon, winning it in 1982 and 1984 and finishing second in 1985 and 1986.

References 

1956 births
Living people
Belgian male long-distance runners
Olympic athletes of Belgium
Athletes (track and field) at the 1980 Summer Olympics
Sportspeople from Hasselt
20th-century Belgian people